Harry Aaron Kissin, Baron Kissin (23 August 1912 – 22 November 1997) was a British businessman and life peer.

Biography 
Kissin was born in Danzig, the son of a Russian Jewish grain merchant. He was educated in Danzig and at the University of Basel, where he gained a doctorate in law. He qualified as a lawyer in Switzerland in 1933, but moved to London the same year.

A close friend and confidant of Harold Wilson, Kissin was made a life peer on 27 June 1974 as Baron Kissin, of Camden in Greater London. Although he was known to be a Labour supporter, he sat as a crossbencher in the House of Lords.

In 2009, it was revealed that Kissin's name had appeared on a MI5 list of Wilson associates who were considered suspicious because of their links with Eastern Bloc countries. Additionally, MI5 considered Kissin untrustworthy because of his use of prostitutes, and asked the Cabinet Secretary to inform Wilson that Kissin was "obviously not a man to be trusted with confidences".

Kissin was related to the pianist Evgeny Kissin.

Coat of arms

References 

1912 births
1997 deaths
Crossbench life peers
20th-century British businesspeople
British people of Russian descent
University of Basel alumni
Chevaliers of the Légion d'honneur
Jewish British politicians
Life peers created by Elizabeth II